The qualifying round for the 1972 European Football Championship consisted of 32 teams divided into eight groups of four teams. Each group winner progressed to the quarter-finals. The quarter-finals were played in two legs on a home-and-away basis. The winners of the quarter-finals would go through, to the final tournament.

Qualified teams

{| class="wikitable sortable"
|-
! Team
! Qualified as
! Qualified on
! data-sort-type="number"|Previous appearances in tournament
|-
|  (host) ||  ||  || 0 (debut)
|-
|  ||  ||  || 3 (1960, 1964, 1968)
|-
|  ||  ||  || 0 (debut)
|-
|  ||  ||  || 1 (1964)
|}

Summary

Tiebreakers
If two or more teams finished level on points after completion of the group matches, the following tie-breakers were used to determine the final ranking:
 Greater number of points in all group matches
 Goal difference in all group matches
 Greater number of goals scored in all group matches
 Drawing of lots

Groups

Group 1

Group 2

Group 3

Group 4

Group 5

Group 6

Group 7

Group 8

Quarter-finals

Goalscorers

References

External links

 UEFA Euro 1972 at UEFA.com

 
Qualifying
1972
1970–71 in European football